USS Great Sitkin (AE-17) was a Mount Hood class ammunition ship, which served in the United States Navy from 1945 to 1973. USS Great Sitkin supported USN operations in several major theatres, including the Mediterranean, the Atlantic, Cuban Missile Blockade, Guantanamo Bay, and the Vietnam War. In the tradition of naming ammunition ships after volcanos, AE-17 was named after the Great Sitkin Volcano in Alaska.

Early service 
USS Great Sitkin was launched under Maritime Commission contract by North Carolina Shipbuilding Co., Wilmington, N.C., 20 January 1945, sponsored by Miss Anne L. Dimond, daughter of Judge Anthony J. Dimond, then congressional representative for Alaska, and commissioned at Charleston, South Carolina.

After shakedown out of Norfolk, Great Sitkin sailed to New York 25 November 1945 to begin dumping condemned ammunition in an assigned area off Sandy Hook, N.J. Great Sitkin continued this duty for a year, returning to Norfolk in November 1946. Great Sitkin'''s pattern of operations for the next few years took her to the Caribbean and the Panama Canal Zone on ammunition replenishment trips, as well as twice to Gibraltar. In addition, she participated in local operations.

 Mediterranean service 
From 1951 Great Sitkin served as a mobile ready reserve source of ammunition. Great Sitkin regularly deployed to the Mediterranean to support regional operations of the Sixth Fleet, and served the fleet during crises in trouble spots such as Lebanon and Suez. When not deployed in the Mediterranean, she operated out of New York, participating in various fleet maneuvers in the Atlantic and the Caribbean Sea.

 Cuban Missile blockade 
During the Cuban Missile Crisis, she sailed for the Caribbean Sea on 23 October 1962, following President Kennedy's announcement of a naval quarantine around Cuba. USS Great Sitkin cruised the Caribbean during the next several weeks carrying reserve ammunition for American ships on quarantine duty off Cuba.

 Atlantic and Mediterranean service 
Departing the Caribbean 16 December 1962, USS Great Sitkin returned to New York and resumed her pattern of operations in the Atlantic and the Mediterranean. On 5 April 1963, Great Sitkin suffered slight damage during a fire of unknown origin while tied up at the Main Ship Repair Corporation in Brooklyn, New York.

Between August 1963 and July 1966 Great Sitkin deployed three times with the 6th Fleet, participating in several Fleet and NATO exercises. After a 3-month overhaul in the Bethlehem Shipbuilding Corporation, Hoboken, N.J., in December 1966 USS Great Sitkin participated in training exercises off Guantanamo Bay, Cuba. Great Sitkin continued to support American ships in the Atlantic and the Mediterranean theaters.

 Vietnam War service 

In 1968, Great Sitkin supported the Seventh Fleet during U.S. Naval operations in the Vietnam War.  USS Great Sitkin participated in the Vietnamese Counteroffensive - Phase IV and Vietnamese Counteroffensive - Phase V, from May to October 1968.  Great Sitkin was awarded 2 campaign stars for Vietnam War service.

 Final disposition 

USS Great Sitkin was decommissioned and struck from the Naval Register on 2 July 1973. The ship was sold by the Defense Reutilization and Marketing Service for scrapping, 1 March 1974 to US Ship Co., Camden, New Jersey. for $152,666.60. USS Great Sitkin'' was dismantled from March to October 1974.

Awards 

American Campaign Medal
World War II Victory Medal (United States)
Navy Occupation Service Medal w/ Europe clasp
National Defense Service Medal (2)
Armed Forces Expeditionary Medal
Vietnam Service Medal (2)
Vietnam Campaign Medal

Commanding officers 

	CDR. Smith, William F., USNR	11 August 1945 - 21 February 1946
	CAPT. Perry, Emil Bates, USN	21 February 1946 - 23 July 1946
	CAPT. Catterton, Max Lee	23 July 1946 - July 1947
	CAPT. Hindman, Joseph Aloysius Esten	July 1947 - June 1948
	CAPT. Busck, Vilhelm Klein,	June 1948 - July 1949
	CAPT. Watson Jr., William Henry,	July 1949 - July 1950
	CAPT. King, George Edward,	July 1950 - July 1951
	CAPT. Butler Jr., William Clayton, RADM	July 1951 - January 1952
	CAPT. Phillips, George Lincoln,	January 1952 - 10 January 1953
	CAPT. Whitfield Jr., James Dickson,	10 January 1953 - 14 December 1953
	CAPT. Wolseiffer, Frederick, USN	14 December 1953 - July 1955
	CAPT. Gage, Norman Dwight,	July 1955 - 28 June 1956
	CAPT. Brock, James Ward, RADM	28 June 1956 - 9 August 1957
	CAPT. Hahn, Harry Barrett,	9 August 1957 - 21 September 1958
	CAPT. Schlech Jr., Walter Frederick, RADM	21 September 1958 - 9 September 1959
	CAPT. Stebbins, Edgar Erwin,	9 September 1959 - 15 August 1960
	CAPT. Manning, William James,	15 August 1960 - 21 July 1961
	CAPT. Weinel, John Philip, ADM	21 July 1961 - 18 July 1962
	CAPT. Burley Jr., Thomas Grover, USN (USNA 1941)	18 July 1962 - 12 July 1963
	CAPT. Boyle Jr., John Earl,	12 July 07.1963 - 14 July 1964
	CAPT. English Jr., Elbert Hartwell	14 July 1964 - 16 July 1965
	CAPT. Esler Jr., Clifford Myers, USN (USNA 1942)	16 July 1965 - 27 July 1966
	CAPT. Boice, Grant	27 July 1966 - 14 September 1967
	CAPT. Riehl Jr., Julian William,	14 September 1967 - 23 December 1968
	CAPT. Hermann, Edward Paul,	23 December 1968 - 30 January 1970
	CAPT. Gerhard Jr., Harry E. RADM	30 January 1970 - 26 October 1970
	CAPT. Rohrer, Paul W. :RADM	26 October 1970 - 16 July 1972
	CAPT. Buchwald, Robert Dale	16 July 1972 - 23 March 1973
	LCDR. La Pean Sr., James W.	23 March 1973 - 2 July 1973

References

External links
USS Great Sitkin Association
 AE-17 Internet Links

 

Mount Hood-class ammunition ships
Ships built in Wilmington, North Carolina
1945 ships
World War II auxiliary ships of the United States
Cold War auxiliary ships of the United States